5436 Eumelos  is a mid-sized Jupiter trojan from the Greek camp, approximately  in diameter. It was discovered on 20 February 1990, by American astronomers Carolyn and Eugene Shoemaker at the Palomar Observatory in California. The dark Jovian asteroid has been identified as the principal body of the small Eumelos family and is likely elongated in shape with a longer-than-average rotation period of 38.4 hours. It was named after the Greek warrior and charioteer Eumelus from Greek mythology.

Orbit and classification 

Eumelos is a dark Jovian asteroid in a 1:1 orbital resonance with Jupiter. It is located in the leading Greek camp at the Gas Giant's  Lagrangian point, 60° ahead on its orbit . It orbits the Sun at a distance of 4.8–5.6 AU once every 11 years and 10 months (4,333 days; semi-major axis of 5.2 AU). Its orbit has an eccentricity of 0.08 and an inclination of 7° with respect to the ecliptic.

Eumelos family 

Fernando Roig and Ricardo Gil-Hutton identified Eumelos as the principal body of a small Jovian asteroid family, using the hierarchical clustering method (HCM), which looks for groupings of neighboring asteroids based on the smallest distances between them in the proper orbital element space. According to the astronomers, the Eumelos family belongs to the larger Menelaus clan, an aggregation of Jupiter trojans which is composed of several families, similar to the Flora family in the inner asteroid belt.

However this family is not included in David Nesvorný HCM-analysis from 2014. Instead, Eumelos is listed as a non-family asteroid of the Jovian background population on the Asteroids Dynamic Site (AstDyS) which based on another analysis by Milani and Knežević.

Naming 

This minor planet was named after Eumelus (Eumelos), son of King Admetus and leader of the Greek contingent from Pherae in the Trojan War. At funeral games for Patroclus, he was the fifth and last in the chariot races competing against Diomedes, Menelaus, Antilochus and Meriones. Though Eumelus came in last, he was awarded by Achilles with the bronze corselet stripped from the Trojan Asteropaios (see table below for the correspondingly named Jupiter trojans). The official naming citation was published by the Minor Planet Center on 12 July 1995.

Physical characteristics 

Euryalos is an assumed C-type asteroid, while the majority of larger Jupiter trojans are D-type asteroids.

Rotation period 

In 2013, a rotational lightcurve of Eumelos was obtained from photometric observations by Linda French and Lawrence Wasserman at the Anderson Mesa Station of the Lowell Observatory, using its 0.8-meter NURO telescope over three consecutive nights until 1 March 2013. Robert Stephens at the Center for Solar System Studies in Landers, California, then observed this asteroid for five more nights during 10–14 March 2013. Lightcurve analysis gave a well-defined rotation period of  hours with a brightness amplitude of 0.68 magnitude, indicative of a non-spherical shape.

The Collaborative Asteroid Lightcurve Link (CALL), labels the period determination for this asteroid as ambiguous.

Diameter and albedo 

According to the survey carried out by the NEOWISE mission of NASA's Wide-field Infrared Survey Explorer, Eumelos measures 37.70 kilometers in diameter and its surface has an albedo of 0.086, while CALL assumes a standard albedo for a carbonaceous asteroid of 0.057 and calculates a diameter of 46.30 kilometers based on an absolute magnitude of 10.4.

Notes

References

External links 
 Lightcurve Database Query (LCDB), at www.minorplanet.info
 Dictionary of Minor Planet Names, Google books
 Discovery Circumstances: Numbered Minor Planets (5001)-(10000) – Minor Planet Center
 Asteroid 5436 Eumelos at the Small Bodies Data Ferret
 
 

005436
Discoveries by Carolyn S. Shoemaker
Discoveries by Eugene Merle Shoemaker
Named minor planets
19900220